Strangebrew is a reality situational comedy television show in the Philippines which formerly aired on UNTV, PTV and Studio 23 from 2001 to 2003.

History and concept
Strangebrew was launched in early summer of 2001 on UNTV. It was hosted by Arvin "Tado" Jimenez, and Angel "Erning" Rivero. The show was directed by R.A. Rivera. The show also featured film makers Ramon Bautista and Jun Sabayton, playing odd characters. The reality comedy show features fun facts about how things are made in a factory, or making a movie. Trivial pursuits and road trip like episodes were produced, as means to make a transition from one topic to another. Some episodes cover two or more topics about everyday ordinary things and people. Some include interviews of a plumber, a toll gate operator, MRT/LRT operator/employees, theater ticket attendees, motion picture deliverymen, the late Raymundo Punongbayan of PHIVOLCS, when Tado and Erning featured Taal Volcano. The known celebrities to make guest appearances were Odette Khan & Julia Clarete. Khan, a veteran television and film actress, played Tado's mother in one episode, while Julia Clarete played "Erning" on a couple of episodes, one of which featured Tado on a date with a mestiza in Manila Zoo.

Notable among the episodes are the catchphrases of the hosts such as "Rakenrol", often said by Tado and "Tama" (correct) being mentioned by Erning whenever Tado says something but in a naivete way. The show usually starts with the opening billboard being shown with the intro of "Macho Gwapito", popularized by Rico J. Puno, being played repeatedly.

Cast
Tado was freelance actor/film maker before landing  the lead role. He appeared in some independent short films as a lead character or a supporting/minor role in mainstream Pinoy cinema and television. He made several appearances on Parokya ni Edgar music videos doing odd characters.

Angel "Erning" Rivero went on to become a host on Studio 23's Breakfast.

Ramon "Monra" Bautista portrayed various characters, a fairy, a mermaid, a film director, a fake plumber, an alien/robot and even played Erning at the end of sci-fi episode narrative with a feature on the COD mannequins in between.

Jun Sabayton portrayed Bautista's cohort in most of the episodes, a mermaid's aid, an assistant director/stuntman, a police officer, an alien/robot and the like.

R.A. Rivera produced/directed various film/video projects for local musicians such as Radio Active Sago Project and Pedicab in which he is a non-musical band member. He directed "Astro" for Radio Active Sago Project, in which he was awarded Best Music Video on MTV Pilipinas.

Julia Clarete also appeared as Erning in two episodes, the feature on Manila Zoo and the local drag racing scene in Parañaque City, respectively.

Episode locations
Lucban, Quezon Province
Los Baños, Laguna
Marikina Shoe Expo, Cubao, Quezon City
AMSPEC Factory, Muntinlupa
Sampaguita Studios Museum, Quezon City
Manila Memorial Park, Parañaque City
SM Megamall, Mandaluyong
Ayala Center, Makati City
Corregidor
Trece Martirez City, Cavite
Philippine General Hospital
Taal, Batangas
Philippine National Railways

Other Appearances of Hosts
Angel Rivero, a.k.a., "Erning" was a former Breakfast Host on Studio 23 where she also wears the Mao Zedong hat that she wears on Strangebrew.
Tado was a former cast member of a former sitcom of ABS-CBN's "Ok Fine Whatever, children's programme Art Jam (with Jeffrey Quizon) and the noontime show MTB.
 Ramon, Angel and Tado have a radio show called The BrewRATs! (Ramon, Angel and Tado Show) which had aired on FM stations 99.5 RT and U92. Its current incarnation, on the internet radio station Dig Radio, runs every Thursday from 9 PM to midnight.

Post Strangebrew
After the cancellation of the reality sitcom show, the hosts are now in a various tv shows and radio programs as of today:

Angel "Erning" Rivero is still active on TV and recently host on a radio comedy show The Brewrats on U92 (now 92.3 NewsFM), and also formerly hosted a daily morning show Breakfast on Studio 23 (now ABS-CBN Sports & Action Channel).

Ramon Bautista* is also active hosting on both TV and radio shows and also a movie actor, Ramon recently have a movie with Dingdong Dantes in a movie Tiktik: The Aswang Chronicles released in 2012 by GMA Films, he's also an author of a best selling funny book, Bakit Hindi Ka Crush Na Crush Mo?, the popular funny pocket book said is now a major motion picture comedy movie produced by Star Cinema in 2013. He is currently one of the hosts/anchors of the online news satire program "Kontrabando" and Barangay Utakan which airs on TV5.

Tado Jimenez recently guested on various movies and TV shows, and of course his very own Toys & Hobbies store called LimiTADO, but sadly, he is one of the 14 killed passengers in a bus collision accident on the morning of February 7, 2014 in Benguet Province.

Jun Sabayton* is now a comedian & host on News 5's programs Wasak, "History with Lourd", & Word Of The Lourd on AKSYON TV, and Aksyon sa Umaga (Formerly Good Morning Club) on TV5 with Radioactive Sago Project Band frontman, and TV5 broadcaster/host Lourd De Veyra. Sabayton recently appeared in an indie movie RAKenROL with his co-stars Glayza De Castro, Diether Ocampo & Jason Abalos in 2012.  He is currently one of the hosts/anchors of the online news satire program "Kontrabando" and Barangay Utakan which airs on TV5.

R.A. Rivera* is now a movie director and still directs in a various mostly indie movies.  He is currently one of the hosts/anchors of the online news satire program "Kontrabando".

Julia Clarete is a former noontime show host in the longest running daily variety noontime show, Eat Bulaga on GMA 7, she's now currently based in Kuala Lumpur Malaysia with her son and her husband.

Bautista, Sabayton, and Rivera are currently anchors of the online, satire-based and profanity-laced newscast, "Kontrabando" with Lourd de Veyra, and is currently seen in their Facebook page.

See also
 List of programs broadcast by UNTV
 List of programs aired by People's Television Network
 List of programs aired by Studio 23
 List of Philippine television shows

References

Philippine reality television series
2001 Philippine television series debuts
2003 Philippine television series endings
People's Television Network original programming
UNTV (Philippines) original programming
Studio 23 original programming